Ingliston Railway Station was a railway station on the Serviceton railway line located in the town of Ingliston. It was opened on December 4, 1889, and closed on April 07, 1963. Today, there are no remains of the former station.

History 
On the 20th of September 1889, a contract was approved by the Victorian Railways to construct the goods shed and platforms. Station was opened with the extension of the Serviceton railway line from Bacchus Marsh to Ballan and was provided with 1 platform, 3 tracks, a goods shed and a Siding. On the 3rd of October 1922, the Station master was withdrawn. The station was closed on April 7, 1963, and was demolished some time after.

References 

Disused railway stations in Victoria (Australia)
Railway stations in Australia opened in 1889
Railway stations closed in 1963